8 Minutes is an American reality documentary television series that premiered on April 2, 2015 on A&E. The reality show chronicles ex-police officer Pastor Kevin Brown meeting sex workers and attempting to convince them to quit the profession within eight minutes. The show is executive produced by Tom Forman, who previously worked on another controversial sex-themed reality program Sex Box.

Reception 
The show has been controversial for its storytelling, tactics of approaching women with hidden cameras and myths about sex work.

Cancellation 
Eight episodes of the program were ordered, however only five have been broadcast in America. In May 2015, A&E announced it was removing the program from its schedule following controversy surrounding the series, and the network isn't planning to air the remaining three episodes, effectively cancelling the series.

Lawsuit 
A group of three women who appeared on the show have filed a lawsuit against A+E Television, saying that they got stiffed after agreeing to appear on the series. Some who were part of 8 Minutes also claimed that they were contacted days or weeks ahead of filming, rather than being surprised like it was depicted on the show.

Episodes

Broadcast
In Australia, the series premiered on the CI Network on July 6, 2015.

References

External links 
 
 
 

2010s American reality television series
2015 American television series debuts
2015 American television series endings
English-language television shows
A&E (TV network) original programming